The Dodiya or Dodia or Dohar is Rajput clan found in Gujarat, Madhya Pradesh (Malwa) and in lesser numbers, in Sardargarh, Rajasthan.
They have ruling states in Madhya Pradesh Piploda princely state, Tal, Mandawal, Borwana, Asawati, uni, Sukheda, Chapaner and many more villages. Dodiya rajputs are also found in Mewar (Sardarghar), where they fought bravely with Maharana against enemies.

References

Rajput clans
Social groups of Rajasthan
History of Gujarat
Rajput clans of Gujarat